The 1966 All-Ireland Senior Hurling Championship was the 80th staging of the All-Ireland Senior Hurling Championship, the Gaelic Athletic Association's premier inter-county hurling tournament. The championship began on 15 May 1966 and ended on 4 September 1966.

Tipperary were the defending champions but were defeated by Limerick in the Munster quarter-final.

On 4 September 1966, Cork won the championship following a 3-9 to 1-10 defeat of Kilkenny in the All-Ireland final. This was their 20th All-Ireland title, their first in twelve championship seasons.

Cork's Seánie Barry was the championship's top scorer with 3-23. Cork's Justin McCarthy was the choice for Texaco Hurler of the Year.

Results

Leinster Senior Hurling Championship

Munster Senior Hurling Championship

All-Ireland Senior Hurling Championship

Championship statistics

Miscellaneous

 Tipperary's defeat by Limerick in the first round of the Munster championship was the team's first defeat since the provincial decider of 1963.  It also put an end to Tipperary's hopes of capturing a third All-Ireland title in-a-row.
 Prior to the Munster semi-final between Limerick and Cork there was a minute's silence in memory of Dr. Rogers, Bishop of Killaloe, who died the previous day.
 In the Leinster semi-final Wexford's Willie Murphy scores a remarkable own-goal for Dublin.

Top scorers

Season

Single game

Clean sheets

References

 Corry, Eoghan, The GAA Book of Lists (Hodder Headline Ireland, 2005).
 Donegan, Des, The Complete Handbook of Gaelic Games (DBA Publications Limited, 2005).
 Nolan, Pat, Flashbacks: A Half Century of Cork Hurling (The Collins Press, 2000).

External links
 Cork GAA website
 Kilkenny GAA website
 Gaelic Athletic Association website

All-Ireland Senior Hurling Championship